Sanchita is a given name. Notable people with the name include:

Sanchita Islam (born 1973), English artist, writer and filmmaker
Sanchita Luitel (born 1983), Nepalese actress
Sanchita Padukone (born 1988), Indian actress
Sanchita Shetty (born 1989), Indian actress
Sanchita Bhattacharya (born 1992), Indian playback singer